Paxtaobod or Pakhtaabad may refer to one of the following localities:

 Paxtaobod, Sirdaryo Region, a town in Sirdaryo Region, Uzbekistan
 Paxtaobod, a city in Andijan Region, Uzbekistan